Bjørn Skau (26 February 1929 – 2 March 2013) was a Norwegian politician for the Labour Party.

Skau was born in Borre.  In 1959, during the third cabinet Gerhardsen, he was appointed personal secretary (today known as political advisor) in the Ministry of Social Affairs. He was promoted to state secretary in 1961, but lost the position temporarily in 1963, when the cabinet Lyng held office. When the fourth cabinet Gerhardsen held office from 1963 to 1965, Skau was again state secretary. During the short-lived first cabinet Brundtland in 1981, Skau was appointed Minister of Justice and the Police.

On the local level he was a member of Larvik municipality council from 1951 to 1957 and of the executive committee of Drammen city council from 1983 to 1987. He chaired the party chapter in Buskerud county from 1981 to 1986.

Skau also headed the health administration in Buskerud from 1978 to 1986, and then became director of Buskerud sentralsykehus, a post he held until 1993. A member of the temperance movement, he led the Norwegian branch of the International Organisation of Good Templars from 1991 to 1997.

Skau died, aged 84, in Fredrikstad. His sister was the acclaimed Norwegian missionary Annie Skau Berntsen.

References

1929 births
2013 deaths
Labour Party (Norway) politicians
Government ministers of Norway
Norwegian state secretaries
Norwegian temperance activists
Ministers of Justice of Norway
International Organisation of Good Templars